P'utu P'utu (aymara p'utu p'utu full of holes, also spelled Potopoto) is a mountain in the Bolivian Andes which reaches a height of approximately . It is located in the Cochabamba Department, Quillacollo Province, Quillacollo Municipality. P'utu P'utu lies west of Jatun Kimray Punta.

References 

Mountains of Cochabamba Department